Alois Hadamczik (born June 20, 1952) is a Czech ice hockey coach. He has been elected as a new president of Czech Ice Hockey Association in June 2022. He is the former head coach of Czech national team. His brother Evžen was a successful football manager.

Playing career
Hadamczik had an unremarkable playing career, his highest playing league was in the second division.

Coach career
For clubs, Alois Hadamczik coached for Sparta Praha, Vítkovice, Třinec, Olomouc, Füssen (in Germany) and Sonthofen (also in Germany). Now, he is a Head coach of the Kometa Brno.

For international, Alois Hadamczik became head coach of Czech junior team in 2003, with which he won bronze medal in the 2005 World Junior Championships. He became head coach of the national "A" team in 2006, and this team won bronze medal during the 2006 Olympics. He was also coach during the 2007 and 2008 World Championships.

References

External links
 

1952 births
Living people
People from Kravaře
Czechoslovak ice hockey players
Czech ice hockey coaches
Czech Republic men's national ice hockey team coaches
Medalists at the 2006 Winter Olympics
Olympic bronze medalists for the Czech Republic
Sportspeople from the Moravian-Silesian Region